The 1890 Massachusetts gubernatorial election was held on November 4, 1890. Incumbent Republican Governor John Q. A. Brackett ran for re-election to a second term in office, but was defeated by Democratic Mayor of Cambridge William Russell.

General election

Results

See also
 1890 Massachusetts legislature

References

Governor
1890
Massachusetts
November 1890 events